Lieutenant General Lawrence George O'Donnell AC (born 17 January 1933) was a senior officer in the Australian Army who served as Chief of the General Staff (1987–1990).

Military career
As an exchange troop leader O'Donnell served with 1st King's Dragoon Guards and was dispatched as part of the British Army response to the Malayan Emergency in 1957.

He was posted to the 3rd Cavalry Regiment and, as a major, was deployed to Vietnam where he was Mentioned in Despatches.

He was appointed Chief of the General Staff in 1987 and made a Companion of the Order of Australia (AC) in 1989 for service to the Australian Army in this role.

In retirement he became Chairman of a campaign to build a permanent monument in Canberra to commemorate the contributions of migrants to Australia. In 2000 he shot for Australia at Bisley, captaining the Kolapore Team.

References

|-

1933 births
Military personnel from Western Australia
Australian generals
Australian military personnel of the Malayan Emergency
Australian military personnel of the Vietnam War
Companions of the Order of Australia
Living people
People educated at Perth Modern School
People from the Wheatbelt (Western Australia)
Chiefs of Army (Australia)